Edward John Hugh Tollemache (born 12 May 1976) is a British aristocrat and banker.

Early life
Tollemache is the eldest son and heir apparent of Timothy Tollemache, 5th Baron Tollemache, and as the son of a baron can use the pre-nominal style of The Honourable. His mother is Alexandra, Lady Tollemache. Tollemache was christened at St. Mary's Church, Helmingham, with Charles, Prince of Wales, as a godparent and uncle Michael Tollemache acting as proxy for the Prince. From 1988 to 1990 he was a Page of Honour to The Queen. He was educated at Marlborough College (1991–1995). He graduated from Newcastle University with a degree in business management and marketing in 1999.

Career
Tollemache worked at Merrill Lynch between graduation and 2002. He worked for Fleming Family & Partners Asset Management from 2002 to 2012 as a fund manager. Since then, he has worked at Lord North Street.

Personal life
Tollemache is married to Sophie Johnstone, daughter of the broadcaster Iain Johnstone, on 3 February 2007 at St Columba's, Church of Scotland, Knightsbridge. The Prince of Wales (as was) Charles III and Andrew Neil were amongst the VIP guests at their wedding ceremony. 

The couple have two sons and a daughter:
Ralph Timothy Jack Tollemache (16 September 2010)
Theo James Tollemache (5 April 2013)
Stella Isabel Dinah Tollemache (21 April 2017)

References

1976 births
Living people
British people of English descent
British people of Scottish descent
People from Mid Suffolk District
People educated at Marlborough College
Alumni of Newcastle University
Eldest sons of British hereditary barons
20th-century British people
21st-century British people
Pages of Honour
British bankers
English landowners
English farmers
Edward
British financial businesspeople